Limerick Cathedral may refer to:

 St Mary's Cathedral, Limerick, founded 1168; originally Roman Catholic, now Church of Ireland
 St John's Cathedral, Limerick, Roman Catholic, founded 1858